Ulla Mitzdorf (15 March 1944 – 19 July 2013) was a German scientist. She contributed to diverse areas including physics, chemistry, psychology, physiology, medicine and gender studies.

Life and Scientific Work
Mitzdorf gained her doctorate in 1974 at the Technical University Munich in theoretical chemistry. Subsequently she worked as scholar at the Max-Planck Institute of Psychiatry in Munich. In 1983 she habilitated in physiology, and in 1984 in medical psychology and neurobiology at the Ludwig Maximilian University of Munich.

From 1988 to 2009 she was Fiebiger Professor for medical psychology at the Ludwig Maximilan University. Simultaneously, she was from 2000 to 2006 women's affairs officer and spokeswoman of the state conference of women and gender equality officers in Bavarian universities.

Ulla Mitzdorf significantly contributed to the understanding of local field potentials (LFPs) in the central nervous system. By implementing the technique of current source density (CSD) she provided additional evidence for the theory that cortical LFPs result from the synaptic activity in the brain.

Mitzdorf died after a short illness on 19 July 2013, aged 69.

References

Sources
 Kürschners Deutscher Gelehrten-Kalender

External links
 Author's profile at Open Library
 References at AuthorMapper

1944 births
2013 deaths
People from Garmisch-Partenkirchen (district)
German psychiatrists
German neurologists
Women neurologists
Women cyberneticists
Technical University of Munich alumni
20th-century women scientists
German women psychiatrists
Cyberneticists